Rakai Tait  (born 11 December 1998) is an American–New Zealand snowboarder who competes internationally for New Zealand.
 
He competed in men's halfpipe at the 2018 Winter Olympics.

References

External links

1998 births
Living people
New Zealand male snowboarders 
Olympic snowboarders of New Zealand
Snowboarders at the 2018 Winter Olympics 
American people of New Zealand descent
Snowboarders at the 2016 Winter Youth Olympics